Morrish may refer to:

Surname
 Alfred Southcott Morrish (1906–1978), English organist and composer
 Ann Morrish (born 1928), British actress
 Ed Morrish, British radio comedy producer
 Jack Morrish (1915–2003), British trade unionist and politician
 James John Morrish (1868–1956), Australian politician
 Jay Morrish (1936–2015), American golf course designer
 Ken Morrish (1919– 2006), Metro Toronto politician
 Paul Morrish (19xx–19xx), Australian rules footballer
 Rory Morrish (born 1968), Irish cross-country skier
 Walter Morrish (1890–1974), provincial politician from Alberta, Canada

Places
 Morrish, Ontario
 Morrish Subdivision, Alberta, locality in Clearwater County, Alberta
 Morrish Public School, a school in Ontario

Other
 Morrish Medal, Australian rules football award
 Morrish Besley (born 1927), Australian engineer,